Abayomi Owonikoko Seun (born September 13, 1992) is a Nigerian-Georgian footballer under contract from 2014 for Mirandela.

External links 
  fcgagra.ge profile
 

1992 births
Living people
Nigerian footballers
Nigerian expatriate footballers
Nigerian expatriate sportspeople in Ukraine
Expatriate footballers in Ukraine
Association football forwards
FC Gagra players
SC Mirandela players
FC Zestafoni players
Valletta F.C. players
FC Volyn Lutsk players
Ukrainian Premier League players
Yoruba people